West Kowloon Highway is a section of Route 3 in Hong Kong, built as part of the Airport Core Programme. This dual-three-lane expressway runs for 4.2 km, connecting Western Harbour Crossing in the south with Tsing Kwai Highway in the north. While the southern section of the road is at grade, the northern part is on a viaduct in order to accommodate the MTR Tung Chung line and the Airport Express. 

It is not to be confused with the older West Kowloon Corridor (currently part of Route 5), which is partly parallel to the West Kowloon Highway.

History
The highway was constructed as part of the Airport Core Programme; a major function of the new highway was to facilitate access to the new Hong Kong International Airport from Hong Kong Island and Kowloon. It was built entirely on the West Kowloon Reclamation, an area of artificial land reclaimed from Victoria Harbour, also under the Airport Core Programme.

The road design and engineering consultancy was awarded to Freeman Fox Maunsell in 1990.

The northern section (between Kwai Chung and Cherry Street in Tai Kok Tsui) was built by a consortium comprising Kumagai Gumi, Maeda Corporation, and China Road and Bridge Corporation. The southern section (between Tai Kok Tsui and the Western Harbour Crossing toll plaza) was constructed by Aoki Corporation. The two contracts commenced on 2 August 1993 and 31 August 1993 respectively.

The road was opened on 19 February 1997.

See also 
 List of streets and roads in Hong Kong

References

External links

 Highways in Kowloon
 West Kowloon Highway
 Google Maps of West Kowloon Highway

Expressways in Hong Kong
Route 3 (Hong Kong)
Sham Shui Po District
Tai Kok Tsui
West Kowloon